Scythris neftae is a moth of the family Scythrididae. It was described by Bengt Å. Bengtsson in 1997. It is found in Libya, Morocco and Tunisia.

References

neftae
Moths described in 1997